José María de Palleja (17 June 1891 – 24 January 1964) was a Spanish sports shooter. He competed in the trap event at the 1924 Summer Olympics.

References

External links
 

1891 births
1964 deaths
Spanish male sport shooters
Olympic shooters of Spain
Shooters at the 1924 Summer Olympics
Sportspeople from Barcelona
20th-century Spanish people